The zeal of the convert is a term describing the very fervent devotion to new beliefs, which are completely different from one's old beliefs.

Usage 
The term "zeal of the convert" is commonly used in popular culture as it is believed that converts to new beliefs are likely to show more devotions than those born in the beliefs.

Examples 
 Khalid Masood, a new convert to Islam, killed four people outside the Palace of Westminster in 2017.
 Richard John Neuhaus, a new convert to Catholicism in 1990, held a stronger belief in Catholic doctrine than those who had only ever been Catholic.
 Enes Kanter, a Swiss-Turkish basketball player, changed his name to Enes Kanter Freedom upon becoming an American citizen in 2021.

Statistics 
In the United Kingdom, less than 4% of Muslims are converts, but 12% of domestic jihadists are converts. 69% of converts claim that religion is vital to them, compared to 62% of non-converts. 51% of converts worship not less than once a week, compared to 44% of non-converts. 82% of converts claim an absolute belief in God, compared to 77% non-converts are that so sure.

See also 
 Horseshoe theory

References

Religious apologists